The Woman's Club of Starke is a historic woman's club in Starke, Florida, located at 201 North Walnut Street. On April 18, 1997, it was added to the U.S. National Register of Historic Places.

History 
The original building was leased for 99 years to the Woman's Club of Starke by the "board of public instruction" in January 1921. The new and current building on the site opened on November 3, 1922, built at a cost of $10,000. Portions of the building were used by the Bradford County Library in 1936, and in 1941 the building was turned over to soldiers of Camp Blanding for their use, and was later used by the United Service Organizations and the Army YMCA. 

A historical marker was placed at the site in 2009. The building remains in use by the Woman's Club of Starke, with preserving the building now being a part of their mission.

References

External links
 Bradford County listings at National Register of Historic Places
 Florida's Office of Cultural and Historical Programs
 Bradford County markers
 Women's Club of Starke

Buildings and structures in Bradford County, Florida
Clubhouses on the National Register of Historic Places in Florida
Women's clubs in Florida
Women's club buildings in Florida
National Register of Historic Places in Bradford County, Florida